Toolamaa may refer to several places in Estonia:

Toolamaa, Põlva County, village in Räpina Parish, Põlva County
Toolamaa, Tartu County, village in Tartu Parish, Tartu County